is a Japanese light novel series by Hōsuke Nojiri. Set in the Solomon Islands, it follows the exploits of high-school girl Yukari Morita, who is pressed into service as an astronaut by a private Japanese space company called the Solomon Space Association when it is unable to build a rocket that can lift the weight of an adult male.

Rocket Girls was adapted into a 12-episode anime television series that aired between February and May 2007. It was produced with the assistance of the Japan Aerospace Exploration Agency, which included astronaut Naoko Yamazaki voicing herself in Episode 7. Bandai Entertainment had the license and released a subtitled-only Complete Collection DVD on October 28, 2008, before it closed doors in 2011. Sentai Filmworks announced on September 27, 2018, that it will release the series on a subtitled-only SD-BD set on January 15, 2019.

Characters
 Morita Yukari (Sendai Eri)
 Matsuri (Nabatame Hitomi)
 Miura Akane (Hasegawa Shizuka) 
 Morita Hiroko (Natsuki Rio)
 Morita Hiroshi (Cho-, born Nagashima Yuuichi)
 Nasuda Isao (Sugou Takayuki)

More characters are listed on the Japanese Wikipedia page: :ja:ロケットガール

Spacecraft

LS-5 Rocket

The LS-5 is a multistage expendable rocket used by the Solomon Space Association (SSA) to launch the first Japanese crewed spaceflight. Although older than the LS-7, this rocket has had more successful launches. This rocket was also used to test the new hybrid-fuel. Three rockets of this type has been constructed so far. Their Command Module (CM) have been called Tanpopo (Dandelion) and Coconut.

LS-7 Rocket

The LS-7 was a multistage expendable rocket used by the Solomon Space Association (SSA). However, after several failed launches, the rocket was retired and replaced by the older LS-5.

List of light novels

The anime adaption covers titles 1 and 2.

Viz Media released the first volume with English translation in 2010.

Episode list

OP/ED songs
 Opening:  "RISE" by ICHIKO
 Ending (#1):  "Ashite Iki no Bus ni Notte" by misae (eps. 1–11)
 Ending (#2):  "Waratte!" ("Smile!") by ICHIKO (ep. 12)

References

Further reading

External links
 Official web site (Japanese)
 WOWOW TV network web page (Japanese)
 

1995 Japanese novels
2007 anime television series debuts
Anime and manga based on light novels
Bandai Entertainment anime titles
Fujimi Fantasia Bunko
Kadokawa Dwango franchises
Hard science fiction
Light novels
Science fiction anime and manga
Sentai Filmworks
Shōnen manga
Solomon Islands in fiction
Television series about space programs
Viz Media novels